WGSN (90.7 FM, "New Life 90.7") is a radio station broadcasting a Southern Gospel music format. Licensed to Newport, Tennessee, United States, the station is currently owned by New Life Studios, Inc. The General Manager for WGSN is Connie Cody.

References

External links
 
 

Southern Gospel radio stations in the United States
Cocke County, Tennessee
Radio stations established in 1975
GSN